Robert Nimrod Miner (December 23, 1941 – November 11, 1994) was an American businessman. He was the co-founder of Oracle Corporation and the producer of Oracle's relational database management system.

From 1977 until 1992, Bob Miner led product design and development for the Oracle relational database management system. In Dec., 1992, he left that role and spun off a small, advanced technology group within Oracle. He was an Oracle board member until Oct., 1993.

Early life 
Bob Miner was born on Dec 23, 1941 in Cicero, Illinois, to an Assyrian family. Both of his parents came from Ada, a village in West Azerbaijan Province, northwest Iran, and had migrated to the US in the 1920s. He was their fifth child of five. Bob Miner graduated in 1963 with a degree in mathematics from the University of Illinois at Urbana-Champaign.

Career 
In 1977 Bob Miner met Larry Ellison at Ampex, where he was Larry's supervisor. Bob Miner left Ampex soon thereafter to found a company called Software Development Laboratories with Ed Oates and Bruce Scott, with Larry Ellison joining the company several months later. It was at this time that Ed Oates introduced Miner and Ellison to a paper by E. F. Codd on the relational model for database management. IBM was slow to see the commercial value of Codd's relational database management system (RDBMS), allowing Miner and Ellison to beat them to the market.

In the start-up days of Oracle Bob Miner was the lead engineer, programming the majority of Oracle Version 3 by himself. As head of engineering Bob Miner's management style was in stark contrast to Larry Ellison, who cultivated Oracle's hard-driving sales culture. Although he expected his engineers to produce, he did not agree with the demands laid upon them by Ellison. He thought it was wrong for people to work extremely late hours and that they should have the chance to see their families. According to Ellison, Miner was "loyal to the people before the company."

Personal life
Bob Miner was diagnosed in 1993 with pleural mesothelioma, a rare form of lung cancer typically caused by exposure to asbestos. He died on November 11, 1994, a month before his 53rd birthday, surrounded by his wife Mary and their three children, Nicola, Justine, and Luke. His wife Mary is the founder and owner of Oakville Ranch Vineyards, a Napa winery. His daughter Nicola Miner is married to author Robert Mailer Anderson.

Miner family's charitable foundation has donated to various San Francisco arts and education institutions. The SFJAZZ Center's auditorium is named after Miner.

References

Further reading
 Symonds, Matthew, 2003. Softwar: An Intimate Portrait of Larry Ellison and Oracle. Simon & Schuster. With commentary by Ellison.
 The Difference Between God and Larry Ellison: Inside Oracle Corporation and Symonds (2003).
 Larry Ellison: Database Genius of Oracle.  Craig Peters
 Everyone Else Must Fail.  Karen Southwick
 The Oracle of Oracle.  Florence M. Stone
 Larry Ellison, Sheer Nerve.  Daniel Ehrenhaft.

External links

1941 births
1994 deaths
American computer businesspeople
American people of Iranian-Assyrian descent
American technology chief executives
American technology company founders
Businesspeople from Illinois
Businesspeople from the San Francisco Bay Area
Deaths from mesothelioma
Oracle employees
People from Cicero, Illinois
University of Illinois Urbana-Champaign alumni
20th-century American businesspeople